Kyaukme A Kyin Thar is a 1969 Burmese black-and-white action drama film, directed by  San Shwe Maung starring Win Oo, Khin Than Nu, Aung Lwin, Phoe Par Gyi and San San Win.

Cast
Win Oo in dual role as Yan Paing, Ko Ko Maung
Khin Than Nu as Mya Sandar
Aung Lwin as Kyaw Zay Ya
Phoe Par Gyi as U Kan Kywal
San San Win as Nan Aye

References

1969 films
1960s Burmese-language films
Films shot in Myanmar
Burmese black-and-white films
1960s action drama films
Burmese action drama films